Ronald Michael Kostelnik (January 14, 1940 - January 29, 1993) was an American football player, a defensive tackle in the National Football League for eight seasons with the Green Bay Packers and one with the Baltimore Colts.

Early years
Born in Colver, Pennsylvania, Kostelnik was the son of a Polish American miner. He graduated from Central Cambria High School in 1957 and played college football at the University of Cincinnati.

Playing career
Kostelnik was selected in the second round of the 1961 NFL draft, 26th overall, by the Packers. For his first several seasons, he backed up veteran Dave Hanner, then became a starter in 1964. Alongside Willie Davis, Henry Jordan, and Lionel Aldridge, Kostelnik was the unheralded member of the Green Bay defensive line. Teammate Jerry Kramer said of him: "There aren't statistics for steady dependable guys who plug up the middle and allow other guys to excel. But that's what Ron did."

In his eight seasons in Green Bay, the Packers won five NFL championships and the first two Super Bowls. He was traded in August 1969 to the Baltimore Colts, then retired after the season.

After football
With a bachelor's and master's degree in education from Cincinnati, Kostelnik planned to be a school administrator. He began working for Mainline Industrial Distributors Inc. of Appleton in sales in the off-season in 1965, became president in 1970, and later was its chief executive officer.

Death
While returning to Wisconsin from a Florida vacation with his wife Peggy in 1993, Kostelnik suffered a fatal heart attack and lost control of his car on Interstate 75 in Scott County, Kentucky. He was age 53 and was survived by his wife, three daughters, and a son.

References

External links
 

1940 births
1993 deaths
American football defensive tackles
Baltimore Colts players
Cincinnati Bearcats football players
Green Bay Packers players
Road incident deaths in Kentucky
People from Cambria County, Pennsylvania
American people of Polish descent
Players of American football from Pennsylvania